Bell Motor Cars Company was an American automobile company, based in York, Pennsylvania.  They were also built under license in Barrie, Ontario.  Unrelated cars named Bell were built in England (1905-1914) and France (1923-1925).

Bell, an assembler rather than a manufacturer, offered light cars with a Herschell-Spillman engine, Westinghouse starter and generator, Stromberg carburetor, Warner steering, Muncie transmission, and Atwater-Kent (domestic) or Simms magneto (export) ignition system.

References

Sources
Clymer, Floyd. Treasury of Early American Automobiles, 1877-1925. New York: Bonanza Books, 1950.

External links
 1921 Model 21 tourer advertisement

See also
List of automobile manufacturers
List of defunct automobile manufacturers

Defunct motor vehicle manufacturers of the United States
Motor vehicle manufacturers based in Pennsylvania
1920s cars
Veteran vehicles
Economic history of Pennsylvania
York, Pennsylvania
Defunct companies based in Pennsylvania
Vehicle manufacturing companies established in 1915
American companies established in 1915